Delvin  is a village in County Westmeath, Ireland; it is located on the N52 road at a junction with the N51 to Navan.

The word Delvin comes from Delbhna. That tribe settled in what is present-day Delvin, along with a branch of the Soghain, in Tricha céd na Delbna Móire agus na Sogan.

Delvin Castle and Clonyn Castle

Delvin Castle (or Nugent Castle), now a ruin, was built in 1181 by Hugh de Lacy, Lord of Meath for his brother-in-law, Gilbert de Nugent. De Nugent came to Ireland with de Lacy in 1171 and settled on some land in Delvin. De Nugent was granted the title Baron of Delvin within the Lordship of Meath, a title now held by the Earl of Westmeath. The ruins of Nugent Castle (not publicly accessible) remain near the center of the town.

A second castle was built several centuries later, hundreds of metres from the centre of the Delvin settlement of that time. This building, known as Clonyn Castle, is situated south of Delvin between the N52 and the Collinstown road. Built in the mid-19th century, by Lord and Lady Greville Nugent, it was sold by the Nugent family in 1922. Changing hands several times during the 20th century, it is now a private residence.

Amenities
The 18-hole Delvin Castle Golf Club is located near the town. There is a bank, church, hotel/guest house, schools, pubs, a few shops and a take-away in the town. There are also a few pubs on the main street. 

Between the 2002 and 2016 census, the population of the town more than doubled from 270 to 740 people. In addition to other developments, plans were unveiled for the provision of a new sports and leisure facility within the village To date, a walking track, floodlit football pitch and basic changing facilities have been provided on site.

Education 
National (primary) schools in the area include St. Patrick's (Crowenstown), St. Tola's (Hiskinstown), and St. Ernan's National Schools.

People
 Sir Thomas Chapman, 7th Baronet, landowner and father of T. E. Lawrence, was brought up at a large manor house near Delvin
 Laurence Ginnell, nationalist politician, was also from Delvin
 Brinsley MacNamara, writer and Delvin native, set the 1918 novel Valley of the Squinting Windows in Delvin (under the fictitious name of "Garradrimna")
 Mary McEvoy, actress who played Biddy Byrne in Glenroe is from Delvin

References

External links
 Delvin Village website
 Delvin Parish

Towns and villages in County Westmeath